Vice Admiral Herbert Sharples Rayner DSC & Bar, CD (16 January 1911 – 30 May 1976) was a Royal Canadian Navy officer who served as Chief of the Naval Staff from 01 August 1960 to 16 July 1964.

Career
Herbert Sharples Rayner joined the Royal Canadian Navy in 1928. He served in the Second World War as Commanding Officer of the destroyer  and then of the destroyer HMCS St. Laurent during 1940, as Staff Officer Operations to the Commander Atlantic Coast from 1942 and as Commanding Officer of the destroyer  from 1943 before becoming Director of Plans in 1944. He was awarded the Distinguished Service Cross for "courage and enterprise in action against enemy submarines in the Western Approaches" and a bar to his DSC for an action "against four German destroyers trying to break through to attack the Allied invasion fleet off Normandy".

He went on to be Commanding Officer of the destroyer  in 1946, Commanding Officer of the Naval Air Section at the shore establishment HMCS Stadacona in 1947 and Commandant of the Canadian Services College Royal Roads in 1948. After that he became Secretary to the Chiefs of Staff Committee in 1950, Commanding Officer of the aircraft carrier  in 1953 and Naval Assistant to the Chief of the Naval Staff 1955. His last appointments were as Chief of Naval Personnel in 1955, Commander Maritime Forces Pacific in 1957 and as Chief of the Naval Staff from 1960 until retiring in 1964.

Awards and decorations
Rayner's personal awards and decorations include the following:

References

Canadian admirals
Canadian recipients of the Distinguished Service Cross (United Kingdom)
Canadian military personnel of World War II
1911 births
1976 deaths
Commanders of the Royal Canadian Navy
Canadian military personnel from Ontario